Walter Price (born 1989) is an American painter based in New York City. He is represented by Greene Naftali and The Modern Institute

Early life 
His military service enabled him to pursue his art education on the GI Bill.

Career

Price's artistic practice often involves materials beyond acrylic or vinyl paint, as he incorporates fabric and photographs into his works. The paintings, often on wood panel, embody compositions that blur the line between abstraction and figuration.

Exhibitions

Group exhibitions
2013 – Full Spectrum, Harriet Tubman Museum, Macon, GA
2016 – Hill of Munch, Rachel Uffner Gallery, New York, NY
2016 – No Free Tax Art Month, 247365, New York, NY
2017 – Mondialité (curated by Hans Ulrich Obrist and Asad Raza), Boghossian Foundation – Villa Empain, Brussels
2017 – 99 Cents or Less, Museum of Contemporary Art Detroit, Detroit, MI
2017 – Fictions, The Studio Museum Harlem, New York, NY
2018 – FRONT International: Cleveland Triennial for Contemporary Art, Cleveland, Ohio
2019 – Techniques of the Observer, Greene Naftali, New York, NY
2019 – 2019 Whitney Biennial, Whitney Museum of American Art, curated by Rujeko Hockley and Jane Panetta

Solo exhibitions
2016 – The Modern Institute, Glasgow, United Kingdom, Walter Price
2016 – Karma, New York, Pearl Lines
2017 – LUMA Foundation, Zurich, 89Plus: Americans 2017
2018 – The Modern Institute, Glasgow, United Kingdom, Pearl Lines
2018 – Kölnischer Kunstverein, Cologne, Germany, Pearl Lines
2018 – MoMA PS1, Queens, New York

Permanent collections
Whitney Museum of Art, New York, NY

Publications 

 2016 - Crystal Black, Karma, New York

References

External links
Walter Price - Contemporary Art Daily

1989 births
Living people
African-American painters
Artists from Georgia (U.S. state)
American contemporary painters
United States Navy sailors
21st-century African-American people
20th-century African-American people
African-American United States Navy personnel